Belrieth is a municipality in the district Schmalkalden-Meiningen, in Thuringia, Germany.

References

Municipalities in Thuringia
Schmalkalden-Meiningen
Duchy of Saxe-Meiningen